An acetate is a salt or ester of acetic acid.

Acetate may also refer to:
Cellulose acetate, the acetate ester of cellulose
Acetate disc, disc used in record production
Projector transparencies, sometimes referred to as acetates, or acetate sheets.